Lake Karamık is a lake in Turkey.

It is a very shallow lake and in some sources it is called a "marsh".
It feeds Lake Eğirdir a bigger lake to the south by means of an underground creek.

Fauna

The fishes of the lake are common carp and northern pike as well as Turkish crayfish. The birds of the lake are  
Eurasian bittern, Eurasian coot, Eurasian spoonbill, Ferruginous duck, greater sand plover,  gull-billed tern, purple heron, pygmy cormorant, squacco heron and white-headed duck

References

Karamik
Çay District